

The V SS Mountain Corps was a Waffen-SS formation that existed in the later periods of World War II. The corps fought against Yugoslav Partisans in the Balkans as part of the 2nd Panzer Army from October 1943 to December 1944. At this time it rarely had more than two low strength divisions. In 1945, the corps fought on the Oder line as part of the 9th Army, in the Frankfurt am Oder area, and in the Battle of Berlin that followed.

Commanders 
 SS-Obergruppenführer und General der Waffen-SS Artur Phleps (1 July 1943 – 21 September 1944) 
 SS-Brigadeführer und Generalmajor der Waffen-SS Karl von Oberkamp (21 September – 1 October 1944)
 SS-Obergruppenführer und General der Waffen-SS Friedrich-Wilhelm Krüger (1 October 1944 – 1 March 1945) 
 SS-Obergruppenführer und General der Waffen-SS Friedrich Jeckeln (1 March – 8 May 1945)

Walter Harzer served as chief of staff.

Subordinate units
  32nd SS Volunteer Grenadier Division 30 Januar
  35th SS-Police Grenadier Division
  36th Waffen Grenadier Division of the SS
  502nd Heavy Panzer Battalion

References

Bibliography
 Beevor, Antony. Berlin: The Downfall 1945, Penguin Books, 2002, .
 Ripley, Tim. The Waffen SS at War, Zenith Imprint, 2004, .

Waffen-SS corps
V
Military units and formations of Germany in Yugoslavia in World War II
Military units and formations disestablished in 1945